The Savuto is a river and valley in Calabria,  Southern Italy, that lies at the intersection of the provinces of Cosenza and Catanzaro. It is also the name of a DOC wine produced in the region.

The name originates from the Latin Sabutus, and it may also correspond to the Greek Ocinaros ("that flows quickly"), on which there was located the ancient town of Temesa.

It is also the name of a small village near the river

The Savuto valley is home to many towns (It: comuni including: Aprigliano, Parenti, Rogliano, Santo Stefano di Rogliano, Marzi, Carpanzano, Malito, Scigliano, Pedivigliano, Altilia, Grimaldi, Aiello Calabro, Martirano, San Mango d'Aquino, Cleto, and Nocera Terinese known collectively as "towns of the Savuto" (It: Paesi del Savuto).

References

External links
 Notizie dalla valle del Savuto 

Rivers of Italy
Rivers of the Province of Cosenza
Rivers of the Province of Catanzaro
Drainage basins of the Tyrrhenian Sea